Sebastian Alojzy Sierakowski (9 January 1743, Bogusławice, Lesser Poland Voivodeship - 9 August 1824, Kraków) was a Polish architect and Jesuit pastor.

Biography 
His uncle, was the Bishop of Przemyśl. From 1764 to 1767, he studied mathematics and theology in Lwów, then continued his theological studies in Vienna and Rome, where he was ordained in 1768. In 1771, he helped establish the Astronomical Observatory of Lwów University, and served as its first Director. 

When the Jesuit Order was suppressed in 1773, he went to Kraków; becoming a Canon at Wawel Cathedral. On the occasion of the arrival of Stanisław August Poniatowski in 1787, he created a restoration plan for Wawel Castle. Later, he served as Crown Custodian, then as a Senator for the Free City of Kraków.

From 1809 to 1814, he served as Rector at the Jagiellonian University. He became a member of the General Confederation of the Kingdom of Poland in 1812. This was followed by designs for reconstructing the decaying Kraków Cloth Hall (1818), and the demolished Kraków Town Hall (1820). These plans were never carried out, due to a lack of funds.

Two of his writings survive: Architektura obejmująca wszelki gatunek murowania i budowania ("Architecture, covering all kinds of bricklaying and building", 2 Vols. 1812), which addresses the folk architecture tradition; and Rzecz o tanim... sposobie murowania w Krakowie domów na przedmieściach ("A thing about a cheap ... way of building houses in the suburbs in Krakow", 1817), which is still in manuscript.

References

External links 

 "Ksiądz Sebastian Alojzy Sierakowski-Jezuita" by Tadeusz Dybeł, from Głos Radziszowa, #13, 2001, pgs.3-4 
 Drawings by Sierakowski in the National Library of Poland @ Polona
 Detailed biography and references @ the Internetowy Polski Słownik Biograficzny

1743 births
1824 deaths
18th-century Polish Jesuits
Architects from Kraków
People from Lesser Poland Voivodeship
19th-century Polish architects